DYuTs Sormovo is an association football club based in Sormovo, Nizhny Novgorod, Russia. SK Avangard Sormovo, one of his predecessors, played on 1957 quarterfinals of de Soviet Cup and seven seasons in the Soviet First League.

Club blackground
 1922–1924: Sormovskiy Sport Club
 1924–1937: Sormovo Nizhny Novgorod
 1937–1940: Sudostroitel Sormovo
 1940–1954: Dzerzhinets Sormovo
 1954–1958: SK Avangard Sormovo
 1958–1962: Raketa
 1962–2002: Sormovo
 2002–present: DYuTs Sormovo

Football clubs in Russia
Association football clubs established in 2002
Sport in Nizhny Novgorod
2002 establishments in Russia